The 2018 California State Treasurer general election was held on November 6, 2018, to elect the State Treasurer of California. Incumbent Democratic Treasurer John Chiang did not run for re-election to a second term and instead ran unsuccessfully for governor.

The race was between Fiona Ma, Democratic, Chair of the State Board of Equalization (California), and Greg Conlon, Republican, former President of the California Public Utilities Commission, after they won the two top spots from the June 5 direct primary election. Ma won the November election handily with more than 64% of all votes, and garnering more votes than any other candidate for Treasurer in the state's history. Ma's victory made her the first woman of color and only the 2nd CPA to ever serve as California State Treasurer.

Primary election

Candidates

Republican Party

Declared
 Jack M. Guerrero, Cudahy City Councilman
 Greg Conlon, former President of the California Public Utilities Commission, nominee for California State Treasurer in 2014, candidate for United States Senate in 2016

Democratic Party

Declared
 Fiona Ma, chairwoman of the California State Board of Equalization
 Vivek Viswanathan, former Special Advisor to Gov. Jerry Brown and Policy Advisor to Hillary Clinton's 2016 presidential campaign.

Potential
 Brian Pendleton, philanthropist, activist and entrepreneur

Declined
 John Chiang, incumbent State Treasurer (running for Governor)
 Fabian Núñez, former Speaker of the California State Assembly

Peace and Freedom Party

Declared
 Kevin Akin, retired hospital maintenance worker and current state chair of the Peace and Freedom Party

Endorsements

Results

Results by county 

Blue represents counties won by Ma. Red represents counties won by Conlon. Green represents counties won by Guerrero.

General election

Results

See also
California gubernatorial election, 2018
California lieutenant gubernatorial election, 2018

References

External links
Official campaign websites
Greg Conlon (R) for State Treasurer
Fiona Ma (D) for State Treasurer

State Treasurer

California state treasurer elections
California